"Der Regen fällt" (German for "The Rain Falls") is a song by German pop rock singer LaFee. It was written by Bob Arnz, Gerd Zimmermann and LaFee for her second studio album, Jetzt erst recht, and a new version of the song was released as the lead single of her best-of compilation album Best Of. 

An English version of the song, "Lonely Tears", later appeared on her English-language album Shut Up.

Track listing 
These are the formats and track listings of major single releases of "Der Regen fällt".

2009 CD version two-track edition
 "Der Regen fällt 2009" – 3:54
 "Der Regen fällt (Akustik Goodbye Mix 2009)" – 2:54

References

External links 
LaFee official website

2007 songs
LaFee songs
2009 singles
Songs written by Bob Arnz
EMI Records singles
Songs written by Gerd Zimmermann (songwriter)